Magerøya is a large island in Troms og Finnmark county, in the extreme northern part of Norway. The island lies along the Barents Sea in Nordkapp Municipality, just north of the Porsanger Peninsula. The mouth of Porsangerfjorden lies off the east coast of the island.

The most northern point on the island is also the northernmost point in Norway outside Svalbard: Knivskjellodden. The island features a bleak, barren, tundra-covered landscape devoid of any trees (except for a few small pockets of mountain birch), with steep cliffs along the coast, and dramatic mountainscapes in the interior. On southern Magerøya, archaeologists have found evidence of settlements dating back 10,000 years.

Places on Magerøya

The main population centre on the island is the town of Honningsvåg. Other smaller places include the fishing villages of Gjesvær, Skarsvåg, Nordvågen, and Kamøyvær. North Cape is a very popular tourist attraction on the northern shore of the island.

Transportation
Magerøya's main claim to fame is the North Cape, a steep cliff cape on the northern coast that is a major tourist attraction. To accommodate the large numbers of tourists that visit the island, a subsea tunnel was built from 1993 to 1999. For a time, it was one of the longest and deepest subsea tunnels in the world. Fog or ice may occur inside the tunnel, even in summer.

Norway's Hurtigruten ferry service stops at the town of Honningsvåg on Magerøya since the waters around the island remain ice-free all year round due to the warm North Atlantic drift. Honningsvåg Airport is located on the eastern part of the island.

Media gallery

See also
List of islands of Norway

References

 
Islands of Troms og Finnmark
Islands of the Barents Sea
Nordkapp